Stepps railway station serves the small town of Stepps, North Lanarkshire, Scotland. The railway station is located on the Cumbernauld Line, 5¼ miles (8 km) north east of Glasgow Queen Street (High Level) and is managed by ScotRail.

History

The station is sited on the former Garnkirk and Glasgow Railway, which originally opened back to 1831 and later formed part of the Caledonian Railway main line from Glasgow Buchanan Street.  A station at Stepps (originally known as Stepps Road) was opened on this line sometime around 1831/2 (when the line was extended to Coatbridge), which was then closed by the British Railways on 5 November 1962.

Electrification was established in 2014 with services from Springburn being extended to Cumbernauld.

Services

2017 

Electric services reverse at Springburn to access the North Clyde Line following the inauguration of electrification between Springburn & Cumbernauld on 18 May 2014, but the service to/from Falkirk remains diesel operated at present.

On Sundays there is an hourly service to  via Glasgow Queen St LL and to Cumbernauld.

2018/19 

From December 2018, a new half hourly Glasgow - Edinburgh via Cumbernauld and Falkirk Grahamston service started, replacing the hourly DMU service and taking over the existing EMU service between Springburn and Cumbernauld. The service uses new Class 385 EMUs.

Facilities 

The station has a car park as well as cycle storage, but is not staffed. There is a ticket machine on the westbound platform, but not on the eastbound platform. A new 48 space car park was opened on the former site of St Joseph's Hall.

References

External links 
 

Railway stations in North Lanarkshire
SPT railway stations
Railway stations served by ScotRail
Railway stations opened by British Rail
Railway stations in Great Britain opened in 1831
1831 establishments in Scotland
Former Caledonian Railway stations
Railway stations in Great Britain closed in 1962
Railway stations in Great Britain opened in 1989
Reopened railway stations in Great Britain